Neram may refer to:

Neram, Indian bilingual film (2013)
 NERAM, New England Regional Art Museum in NSW, Australia